The western yellow bat (Dasypterus xanthinus) is a species of vesper bat found in Mexico and the southwestern United States.  This species roosts in trees such as Populus fremontii, Platanus wrightii, and Quercus arizonica.  If available, the western yellow bat will use the dead fronds that encircle palm trees as a roosting site.

Taxonomy and etymology
It was described as a new subspecies of bat in 1897 by British zoologist Oldfield Thomas. He listed it as a subspecies of the southern yellow bat, with a trinomen of Dasypterus ega xanthinus. In 2015, Baird et al. argued that this species and other yellow bats should be in the genus Dasypterus, though others have since argued that Dasypterus should remain a subgenus of Lasiurus. In 1988, Baker et al. argued that it should be considered a full species based on its genetics. In a 2017 follow-up to their 2015 study, Baird et al. again expressed that Aeorestes, Dasypterus, and Lasiurus should be separate genera comprising the tribe Lasiurini. They stated that the genetic distance of the three genera was much greater than observed between other bat genera, on average. In contrast to the average of  12.0% inter-generic divergence reported from another study on bats, Aeorestes and Dasypterus varied 18.79%; Aeorestes and Lasiurus varied 19.05%; and Dasypterus and Lasiurus varied 19.79%. Its species name "xanthinus" is from Ancient Greek xanthos, meaning "pertaining to yellow."

Description

The western yellow bat is a small species, though it is larger than the southern yellow bat. Its fur is bright yellow.

Range and habitat
Its range includes the Southwestern United States of Arizona, California, and New Mexico, in addition to parts of Mexico.
It is found in West and Central Mexico, as well as Baja California.

Conservation
As of 2017, it is evaluated as a least-concern species by the IUCN.

References

Bats of Mexico
Bats of the United States
Bat, Western Yellow
Mammals described in 1897
Taxonomy articles created by Polbot
Taxa named by Oldfield Thomas
Lasiurini
Taxobox binomials not recognized by IUCN